Raymond Joseph Martin (March 13, 1925 – March 7, 2013) was a former Major League Baseball pitcher. He played three seasons with the Boston Braves in 1943 and 1947 to 1948.

Marin served with the military police in the United States Army in the European Theater of Operations during World War II.

References

External links

Boston Braves players
Major League Baseball pitchers
1925 births
2013 deaths
Baseball players from Massachusetts
People from Norwood, Massachusetts
Evansville Braves players
Hartford Chiefs players
Milwaukee Brewers (minor league) players
Atlanta Crackers players
Seattle Rainiers players
United States Army personnel of World War II
American military police officers